The Portuguese Governor's Mansion in Pondicherry, India is a historic building.

External links
website with picture

Governors' mansions
History of Puducherry
Historic sites in India
Buildings and structures in Pondicherry (city)
Official residences in India